Kargan-e Qadim (also Romanized as Kargān-e Qadīm; also known as Kargān and Karkan) is a village in Mehranrud-e Jonubi Rural District of the Central District of Bostanabad County, East Azerbaijan province, Iran. At the 2006 census, its population was 906 in 193 households. The following census in 2011 counted 2,821 people in 670 households. The latest census in 2016 showed a population of 2,742 people in 729 households; it was the largest village in its rural district.

References 

Bostanabad County

Populated places in East Azerbaijan Province

Populated places in Bostanabad County